Moné Hattori (服部 百音, Hattori Mone, born September 14, 1999) is a Japanese violinist. She was the first prize winner of the 11th Lipinski & Wieniawski Competition for Young Violinists in Lublin, Poland. She was also the first prize winner of the 7th International Competition for Young Violinists in Novosibirsk, Russia. She is the daughter of Takayuki Hattori, granddaughter of Katsuhisa Hattori, and great-granddaughter of Ryoichi Hattori.

Biography 
Moné Hattori was born into a musical family in Tokyo, Japan. Hattori started studying the violin at the age of five with Goro Masuda; a year later, she studied under Akuri Suzuki. At the age of eight, Hattori gave her recital debut with orchestra with the Saint-Saëns Violin concerto. Since then, she has performed numerous recitals. As of 2020, Hattori studies under Zahkar Bron at the Bron Academy, as well as Akiko Tatsumi at the Toho Gakuen School of Music. Her solo debuts include the Deutsches Symphonie-Orchester Berlin, Osaka Philharmonic, Tokyo Philharmonic, Osaka Symphony and the Franz Liszt Chamber Orchestra.

Hattori currently plays on a 1743 Pietro Guarneri violin loaned from the Ueno Fine Chemicals Industry, Ltd.

Awards and appearances 

 2009: First prize, 11th Lipinski & Wieniawski Competition for Young Violinists, Lublin, Poland
 2013: Grand Prix, 9th International Competition “Young Virtuosos”, Bulgaria
 2013: First prize, 7th International Competition for Young Violinists, Novosibirsk, Russia
 2015: Grand Prix, Boris Goldstein International Violin Competition, Bern, Switzerland
 First prize, Japan Arts Competition
 Vladimir Ashkenazy and Vadim Repin Debut at the Trans-Siberian Art Festival

Discography 

 2016/2019: Waxman Carmen Fantasy and Shostakovich Violin Concerto No.1 (Avex Classics)
 2020: Recital (Avex Classics)

References

External links 
 

1999 births
Japanese violinists
Japanese women violinists
Living people
Musicians from Tokyo
Women violinists